David Tremblay (born September 18, 1987 in Windsor, Ontario) is a male freestyle wrestler from Canada. In 2011 Tremblay won the gold medal at the Pan American Qualification tournament and thus qualified to compete at the 2012 Summer Olympics. In 2014 Tremblay won the men's 61-kilogram title in the 2014 Commonwealth Games, defeating the 2013 World Bronze Medalist from India in the Finals.

He is also a 5 times Canadian Interuniversity Champions (CIS).

David Tremblay is a graduate of Concordia University in Montreal (BA 14).

References

External links
 

1987 births
Commonwealth Games gold medallists for Canada
Franco-Ontarian people
Living people
Olympic wrestlers of Canada
Sportspeople from Windsor, Ontario
Wrestlers at the 2012 Summer Olympics
Wrestlers at the 2014 Commonwealth Games
Canadian male sport wrestlers
Commonwealth Games medallists in wrestling
21st-century Canadian people
Medallists at the 2014 Commonwealth Games